Lecithocera glaphyritis is a moth in the family Lecithoceridae. It was described by Edward Meyrick in 1918. It is found in Sri Lanka.

The wingspan is about 14 mm. The forewings are very glossy ash grey and the hindwings are ochreous whitish, the apex suffused with pale grey.

References

Moths described in 1918
glaphyritis